"Soon" is a 1927 song composed by George Gershwin, with lyrics by Ira Gershwin.

It was introduced by Margaret Schilling and Jerry Goff in the 1930 revision of the musical Strike Up the Band.

Notable recordings 
Sarah Vaughan - In the Land of Hi-Fi (1955)
Ella Fitzgerald - Ella Sings Gershwin (1950), Ella Fitzgerald Sings the George and Ira Gershwin Songbook (1959)
Curtis Fuller - The Opener (1957)
Mitzi Gaynor - Mitzi Gaynor Sings the Lyrics of Ira Gershwin (1959)
Oscar Peterson - The Trio (1961)
Sammy Davis Jr. - The Wham of Sam (1961)
The Modern Jazz Quartet - Gershwin Ballad Medley (1958)
Kiri Te Kanawa - Kiri Sings Gershwin (1987)

References

1927 songs
Songs from musicals
Songs with music by George Gershwin
Songs with lyrics by Ira Gershwin